The  is a Bo′Bo′+Bo′Bo′ wheel arrangement twin unit DC electric freight locomotive operated by JR Freight in Japan since 2001.

Operations
The locomotives are built at the Toshiba factory in Fuchū, Tokyo. They are all based at Takasaki depot, and are primarily used on oil tank trains north of Tokyo and on the steeply-graded Chūō Main Line, Shinonoi Line, and Joetsu Line, replacing pairs of Class EF64s.

, 25 Class EH200 locomotives are in service (EH200-901 and EH200-1 to EH200-24).

Variants
 EH200-900: Prototype locomotive EH200-901, built 2001
 EH200-0: Full-production locomotives built from 2003 onward

EH200-901 prototype
The pre-production prototype, EH200-901, was delivered to Takasaki depot in 2001, and entered revenue service in October 2002 following extensive testing.

EH200-0 full-production version
Following evaluation of the prototype version, the first full-production locomotive, EH200-1, was delivered to Takasaki in March 2003. A number of minor improvements were incorporated, with the main external differences from the prototype being as follows.
 Elimination of centre pillar in the cab windscreens
 Redesigned windscreen wipers
 "Blue Thunder" logo on bodyside
 Reduced size white "JRF" logo on the body side

Classification

The EH200 classification for this locomotive type is explained below. As with previous locomotive designs, the prototype is numbered EH200-901, with subsequent production locomotives numbered from EH200-1 onward.
 E: Electric locomotive
 H: Eight driving axles
 200: DC locomotive with AC motors

See also
 JNR Class EH10
 JR Freight Class EH500
 JR Freight Class EH800

References

1500 V DC locomotives
Electric locomotives of Japan
EH200
Bo′Bo′+Bo′Bo′ locomotives
1067 mm gauge locomotives of Japan
Railway locomotives introduced in 2002
Toshiba locomotives